The Uganda Military Academy, is a military academy in Uganda, East Africa. Traditionally, graduates of the Military Academy are commissioned as officers in the Uganda People's Defence Force. Other African countries also send their cadets to the academy for training.

Location
The coordinates of Kabamba are: 0°15'00.0"N, 31°11'06.0"E (Latitude:0.2500; Longitude:31.1850).

History
The academy was formed in 2007 by merging the Cadet Officer School, which was originally housed at  Jinja, with the Uganda School of Infantry, originally housed at Kabamba. Past Commandants at the institution have included Lieutenant General Andrew Gutti, Major General Chachu Neutral, and the late Brigadier Clovis Kalyebara. Mathew Gureme and Brigadier Dick Olum have each served as Chief Instructors at the Academy.

Mission
The Military Academy aims to prepare and qualify cadets to become combat officers capable of commanding their units during times of peace and war, under various psychological, physical and morale conditions. Through scientific and cultural training that enables them to efficiently adapt to the advances in military science, cadets are schooled to maintain the highest level of combat efficiency and morale within their units. The school has plans to offer university-level degree courses in defence and security studies.

Beginning in 2017, the academy began offering a three-year course leading to the award of a Bachelor of Arts degree in Defence and Security Matters.

See also

References

External links
History of Uganda Military Academy, Kabamba

Military academies
Military of Uganda
Military schools in Uganda
Uganda People's Defence Force
Mubende District
Educational institutions established in 2007
2007 establishments in Uganda